"The Pledge Drive" is the 89th episode of NBC sitcom Seinfeld. This was the third episode of the sixth season. It aired on October 6, 1994. The episode revolves around Jerry, George, and Kramer's volunteer efforts with a PBS pledge drive. Subplots include Jerry's grandmother going on a perilous adventure through the city to deal with bounced birthday checks, Elaine committing a series of misunderstandings stemming from the high-pitched voice of her friend Noreen's boyfriend, and the start of a new trend in eating finger foods with utensils.

Plot
Jerry tells Elaine that her friend Noreen was hitting on him. Elaine is skeptical, since Noreen has a boyfriend. She calls and asks about this, but the person on the end of the line identifies himself as Noreen's boyfriend Dan, who Elaine mistook for Noreen because he is a "high-talker" (i.e. his voice is high-pitched). This angers Dan and Noreen, particularly since Jerry's allegation is untrue. When Elaine explains her mistake to Noreen, she is dismayed that her boyfriend's voice can be so easily mistaken for a woman's, and turns her romantic interest towards Jerry.

Jerry agrees to help a public television fundraiser for New York PBS member station WNET and Kramer volunteers with answering phones. The PBS representative, Kristen, sends Jerry a thank you card. While going over the fundraiser script with him, she notices the card in the trash and is offended. He tries to prove his sentimentality by showing her cards from his grandmother "Nana" that he has saved for years. This only offends her further, and Kramer is outraged when he sees Jerry never cashed the checks inside the cards.

At Monk's, Jerry asks George to bring a Yankee to the pledge drive. Elaine tells them how she witnessed her boss Mr. Pitt eat a Snickers bar with a knife and fork. George sees this as a classy way of eating. When he asks the waitress about the bill, she points to it with her middle finger, leading George to think she is surreptitiously giving him the finger.

When the rest of Yankee management opposes the idea of supporting the pledge drive on the grounds that they already give to channel 11 (WPIX-TV, the real-life over-the-air broadcaster for Yankee games at the time of this episode's airing), George changes their minds by insinuating that PBS is classier than channel 11 while eating a Snickers bar with knife and fork. This starts a trend that sweeps the city and evolves to include other finger foods such as cookies and donuts.

Jerry cashes Nana's checks to appease Kramer; since they were written on an account that was abandoned, the account becomes overdrawn. Nana leaves home for the first time in years to go to the branch and settle matters, causing her to be presumed missing. When she calls Jerry from the bank, Elaine answers the phone and assumes it's Dan, since he has been harassing her over Noreen's obsession with Jerry. She tells Nana to drop dead and hangs up. When Dan attempts to confront Jerry about Noreen, Kramer thinks Dan is in love with Jerry. While driving Yankee Danny Tartabull, George sees a driver supposedly give him the middle finger and insists on pursuing him. Catching up with him at a gas station, he finds the driver actually has his hand in a cast and splint that forces his middle finger to be extended. The delay causes Tartabull to miss the pledge drive. Nana calls the drive and Kramer persuades her to donate $1,500. Uncle Leo panics since Nana is on a fixed income and can't afford such a large gift, and runs onto the set yelling "Stop the show!" In light of the disasters of Tartabull's no-show and the disturbance caused by Leo, Kristen sends Jerry another greeting card, this one of a bunny giving him the finger.

Production
The episode's writers Tom Gammill and Max Pross were talking one day about someone they knew in college who ate his Snickers bars with a knife and fork; Larry David encouraged them to include this in the episode. Because Ian Abercrombie could not chew fast enough to finish a bite of Snickers bar between his lines of dialogue, David told him to swallow each bite whole. Abercrombie recalled that over the course of rehearsals and multiple takes, he consumed the equivalent of about four Snickers bars in this manner, an experience so unpleasant that he hasn't eaten a Snickers bar since. The day after the episode first aired, Abercrombie was having lunch in a restaurant; while he was waiting for his coffee, the waiter put a plate with a Snickers bar on his table. Apparently, the whole restaurant was in on the joke.

After filming was completed, the producers decided that Brian Reddy's high voice was not high enough, and hired a voice actress to dub over all his lines. The banker's line "Wait, we can do this over the phone" was also added in post by a different actor, since the show's producers realized that the episode made it look like the banker was to blame for Nana's dangerous adventure, which was not the intent.

A number of sequences were filmed but deleted before broadcast, including George demonstrating high-pitched talking and Kramer finding his own greeting card for Jerry in the trash. Due to their inordinate number some of them, such as scenes showing Nana riding a dangerous-looking subway and talking to a postal worker, were not even included on the Seinfeld DVD releases.

References

External links 
 

Seinfeld (season 6) episodes
1994 American television episodes
Telethons